The Calgary Mountaineers are a box lacrosse organization based in Calgary, Alberta, Canada. The organization has teams at three levels of the Rocky Mountain Lacrosse League: a Senior B squad, along with a Junior A and Junior B teams.

Sr. B Mountaineers
The Senior Mountaineers have existed for over 30 years, and in 1983, captured the Canadian Senior B championship, the Presidents Cup.

Jr. A Mountaineers
Established in 2006, the Calgary Jr. A Mountaineers are one of four teams in the province at the Junior A level. They were the host team for the 2008 Minto Cup, Canada's national Junior A championship. The tournament was held at the Max Bell Centre in August 2008, won by Orangeville Northmen.

Jr. B Mountaineers
See Calgary Jr. B Mountaineers.

References

External links
Sr. B Mountaineers
Jr. A Mountaineers

Mou
Lacrosse teams in Alberta
Sports clubs established in the 1970s
1970s establishments in Alberta